Peter Kerr may refer to:
 Peter Kerr, 12th Marquess of Lothian (1922–2004), Scottish peer, politician and landowner
 Peter Kerr (architect) (1820–1912), Australian architect
 Peter Kerr (author) (born 1940), Scottish author
 Peter Kerr (footballer, born 1891) (1891–1969), Scottish international footballer
 Peter Kerr (footballer, born 1948), Australian footballer for Carlton Football Club
 Peter Kerr (footballer, born 1954), Australian footballer for South Melbourne Football Club
 Peter Kerr (political scientist) (born 1967),  senior lecturer in political science at the University of Birmingham
 Peter Kerr (priest) (1775–?), member of the Church of Jesus Christ of Latter-Day Saints
 Peter Kerr (Texas settler) (1795–1861), founder of Burnet, Texas and a member of the Old Three Hundred
 Peter Kerr (water polo), Australian water polo official, swore the judge oath at the 2000 Summer Olympics

See also
 Peter Carr (disambiguation)